The men's rope climbing was an artistic gymnastics event held as part of the gymnastics at the 1904 Summer Olympics programme. It was the second time the event was held at the Olympics. An unknown number of gymnasts competed; only three are known, all American. The competition was held on Friday, October 28, 1904. George Eyser won the event, with Charles Krause second and Emil Voigt third.

Background

This was the second appearance of the event, which was held four times. The event had been held in 1896 and would appear again in 1924 and 1932. The five-time reigning AAU champion, Edward Kunath, did not compete.

Competition format

The rope climb was 25 feet (7.62 metres) in height. Each contestant had three attempts. The fastest of the three climbs counted. Unlike in 1896, there were no style points—only speed counted.

Schedule

Results

References

Sources
 
 

Rope climbing